The following is a list of state highways in the U.S. state of Louisiana designated in the 1200–1299 range.

All are owned and maintained by the Louisiana Department of Transportation and Development (La DOTD).  The routes up to and including LA 1241 were designated in the 1955 Louisiana Highway renumbering.  The remainder have been added to the system in numerical order as needed, beginning with LA 1242 in 1998.  All but thirteen of the routes on this list are proposed for deletion as part of La DOTD's Road Transfer Program.


Louisiana Highway 1200

Louisiana Highway 1200 (LA 1200) runs  in a general north–south direction from the intersection of two local roads in Wilda to a junction with LA 1 in Boyce.  The highway is bannered as an east–west route as it intersects two major north–south routes (I-49 and LA 1).  With the exception of the portion north of I-49, LA 1200 is currently proposed for deletion as part of La DOTD's Road Transfer Program.

Louisiana Highway 1201

Louisiana Highway 1201 (LA 1201) runs  in a north–south direction along Alexander Street from Johnson Street to LA 121 in Hot Wells.  It is currently proposed for deletion as part of La DOTD's Road Transfer Program.

Louisiana Highway 1202

Louisiana Highway 1202 (LA 1202) ran  in an east–west direction along North Bayou Rapides Road from LA 496 east of McNutt to a second junction with LA 496 at Weil.  The route was transferred to local control in 1998.

Louisiana Highway 1203

Louisiana Highway 1203 (LA 1203) runs  in an east–west direction from a local road northwest of Pineville to the US 167 frontage road north of Pineville.  It is currently proposed for deletion as part of La DOTD's Road Transfer Program.

Louisiana Highway 1204

Louisiana Highway 1204 (LA 1204) runs  in an east–west direction from LA 3225 in Tioga to LA 623 in Ball.  It is currently proposed for deletion as part of La DOTD's Road Transfer Program.

Louisiana Highway 1205

Louisiana Highway 1205 (LA 1205) runs  in an east–west direction along Philadelphia Road from LA 28 at Libuse to a point just beyond Libuse Czech Cemetery.  It is currently proposed for deletion as part of La DOTD's Road Transfer Program.

Louisiana Highway 1206

Louisiana Highway 1206 (LA 1206) runs  in a loop around Deville off of LA 115.  It is currently proposed for deletion as part of La DOTD's Road Transfer Program.

Louisiana Highway 1207

Louisiana Highway 1207 (LA 1207) runs  in an east–west direction from LA 28 in Holloway to LA 1206 east of Deville.  It is currently proposed for deletion as part of La DOTD's Road Transfer Program.

Louisiana Highway 1208

Louisiana Highway 1208 (LA 1208) consists of five road segments with a total length of  that are located in the Rapides Parish city of Alexandria.  All existing segments, with the exception of LA 1208-2, are proposed for deletion as part of La DOTD's Road Transfer Program.

LA 1208-1 runs  along Willow Glen Road from the I-49 frontage road to LA 1 (3rd Street).
LA 1208-2 runs  along Sterkx Road from Horseshoe Drive to US 71 (MacArthur Drive).
LA 1208-3 runs  along Jackson Street from LA 488 (Twin Bridges Road) to the junction of US 165 Bus., LA 1, and LA 28 Bus. at Bolton Avenue.
LA 1208-4 runs  along the US 71 frontage road from Old Baton Rouge Highway to Richland Road, continuing onto Eddie Williams Avenue to its intersection with Hudson Boulevard.
LA 1208-5 runs  along Masonic Drive from the junction of US 71 and US 165 at Masonic Circle to an intersection with the Masonic Drive frontage roads.

Routes deleted since the 1955 Louisiana Highway renumbering include:
LA 1208-4 formerly ran  through Alexandria.  It traveled along the one-way pair of 2nd and 4th Streets from LA 1 (Winn Street) to Scott Street, then along Third Street and North Third Street to a junction with US 71/US 165 (MacArthur Drive).  The route was transferred to local control in 2006, and its designation was given to the current route in 2010.
LA 1208-5 formerly ran  along Shamrock Street from the Pineville western city limits to a junction with US 165/LA 28 (Main Street) within the city limits.  The route was transferred to local control by 1958, and its designation was given to the current route in 2010.
LA 1208-6 ran  along Baywood Drive in Pineville from US 165 Byp. to mainline US 165 (Military Highway).  The route was transferred to local control by 1958.

Louisiana Highway 1209

Louisiana Highway 1209 (LA 1209) runs  in a north–south direction from a local road to a junction with LA 19 in Zachary.  As of 2017, it is under agreement to be removed from the state highway system and transferred to local control.

Louisiana Highway 1210

Louisiana Highway 1210 (LA 1210) ran  in an east–west direction from LA 13 south of Crowley to a local road southeast of Crowley.  The route was transferred to local control by 1958.

Louisiana Highway 1211

Louisiana Highway 1211 (LA 1211) runs  in a southwest to northeast direction from a local road southwest of New Llano to a junction with US 171 in New Llano.  The route is bannered north–south, and its mileposts increase from the northern end contrary to common practice.  LA 1211 is currently proposed for deletion as part of La DOTD's Road Transfer Program.

Louisiana Highway 1212

Louisiana Highway 1212 (LA 1212) ran  in a north–south direction from US 171 to LA 8 in Leesville.  The route was transferred to local control in 2006.

Louisiana Highway 1213

Louisiana Highway 1213 (LA 1213) runs  in a north–south direction along Kurthwood Road from US 171 to the junction of LA 8/LA 28 and LA 117 in Leesville.  It is currently proposed for deletion as part of La DOTD's Road Transfer Program.

Louisiana Highway 1214

Louisiana Highway 1214 (LA 1214) ran  in an east–west direction from LA 8 in Slagle to LA 28 east of Slagle.  The route became part of LA 121 in 1975.

Louisiana Highway 1215

Louisiana Highway 1215 (LA 1215) runs  in an east–west direction from a dead end at the Toledo Bend Reservoir to a junction with LA 191 south of Zwolle.  It is currently proposed for deletion as part of La DOTD's Road Transfer Program.

Louisiana Highway 1216

Louisiana Highway 1216 (LA 1216) runs  in an east–west direction from US 171 in Zwolle to LA 175 north of Many.  It is currently proposed for deletion as part of La DOTD's Road Transfer Program.

Louisiana Highway 1217

Louisiana Highway 1217 (LA 1217) runs  in a north–south direction along Marthaville Road from LA 6 in Many to a local road north of Many.  It is currently proposed for deletion as part of La DOTD's Road Transfer Program.

Louisiana Highway 1218

Louisiana Highway 1218 (LA 1218) runs  in an east–west direction from LA 191 west of Noble to US 171 in Noble.  The route is bannered east–west, and its mileposts increase from the eastern end contrary to common practice.  LA 1218 is currently proposed for deletion as part of La DOTD's Road Transfer Program.

Louisiana Highway 1219

Louisiana Highway 1219 (LA 1219) ran  in a north–south direction from LA 1218 west of Noble to LA 174 west of Converse.  The route became part of LA 191 in 1981.

Louisiana Highway 1220

Louisiana Highway 1220 (LA 1220) runs  in an east–west direction from LA 119 in Bermuda to a local road southeast of Bermuda.  It is currently proposed for deletion as part of La DOTD's Road Transfer Program.

Louisiana Highway 1221

Louisiana Highway 1221 (LA 1221) runs  in a north–south direction from LA 120 in Bethany to the intersection of two local roads north of Bethany.  With the exception of the southern portion serving the Rebel State Historic Site, LA 1221 is proposed for deletion as part of La DOTD's Road Transfer Program.

Louisiana Highway 1222

Louisiana Highway 1222 (LA 1222) runs  in a southwest to northeast direction from LA 485 to a local road northeast of Robeline.  The route is bannered east–west.  It is currently proposed for deletion as part of La DOTD's Road Transfer Program.

Louisiana Highway 1223

Louisiana Highway 1223 (LA 1223) runs  in a north–south direction from LA 1 Bus. to LA 6 Bus. in Natchitoches.  It is currently proposed for deletion as part of La DOTD's Road Transfer Program.

Louisiana Highway 1224

Louisiana Highway 1224 (LA 1224) runs  in a southwest to northeast direction along Williams Avenue from LA 1 Bus. to Blanchard Road in Natchitoches.  The route is bannered east–west.  It is currently proposed for deletion as part of La DOTD's Road Transfer Program.

Louisiana Highway 1225

Louisiana Highway 1225 (LA 1225) runs  in a north–south direction from US 71 at Luella to LA 6 in Clarence.  It is currently proposed for deletion as part of La DOTD's Road Transfer Program.

Louisiana Highway 1226

Louisiana Highway 1226 (LA 1226) runs  in a southwest to northeast direction from LA 1225 south of Clarence to the intersection of two local roads northeast of Clarence.  The route is bannered east–west.  It is currently proposed for deletion as part of La DOTD's Road Transfer Program.

Louisiana Highway 1227

Louisiana Highway 1227 (LA 1227) runs  in an east–west direction from LA 1226 to a dead end at Saline Bayou northeast of Clarence.  The route is bannered north–south despite its geographic direction.  It is currently proposed for deletion as part of La DOTD's Road Transfer Program.

Louisiana Highway 1228

Louisiana Highway 1228 (LA 1228) runs  in a north–south direction from a local road southeast of Atlanta to a junction with US 84 west of Winnfield.  The route is bannered east–west despite its geographic direction.  It is currently proposed for deletion as part of La DOTD's Road Transfer Program.

Louisiana Highway 1229

Louisiana Highway 1229 (LA 1229) runs  in a southeast to northwest direction from LA 34 to a point on Parish Road 775 north of Atlanta.  The route is bannered north–south.  It is currently proposed for deletion as part of La DOTD's Road Transfer Program.

Louisiana Highway 1230

Louisiana Highway 1230 (LA 1230) runs  in an east–west direction from LA 472 north of Zion to LA 500 in Georgetown.

The route heads due east from LA 472 along the Grant–Winn parish line.  After , LA 1230 turns south at a T-intersection with LA 3098 into Grant Parish.  A short distance later, the highway curves to the southeast and proceeds into the village of Georgetown.  Here, LA 1230 intersects LA 3098 for a second time then zigzags across the Union Pacific Railroad (UP) tracks.  A ramp provides access to southbound US 165, which crosses over the rail line en route to Alexandria.  Immediately after passing under the US 165 overpass, LA 1230 reaches its terminus at a junction with LA 500 opposite Lee Street.  LA 1230 is an undivided two-lane highway for its entire length.

Prior to the 1955 Louisiana Highway renumbering, LA 1230 was designated as State Route 619.  The entire route is currently proposed for deletion as part of La DOTD's Road Transfer Program.

Louisiana Highway 1231

Louisiana Highway 1231 (LA 1231) consists of two road segments with a total length of  that are located in the Winn Parish city of Winnfield.  A third segment was deleted following the 1955 Louisiana Highway renumbering.  Both extant segments are currently proposed for deletion as part of La DOTD's Road Transfer Program.

LA 1231-1 runs  from a point on Cedar Drive south of the city limits to the junction of US 84/US 167/LA 34 (East Lafayette Street) and LA 1231-2 (South Grove Street) within the city limits.
LA 1231-2 runs  from the junction of US 84/US 167/LA 34 (East Lafayette Street) and LA 1231-1 (South Grove Street) within the city limits to a second junction with US 167 north of the city limits.
LA 1231-3 ran  from the junction of US 84/US 167 and LA 34 at West Court and South Jones Streets to a second junction with US 84 and LA 34 at East Boundary Avenue and Maple Street.  The route was transferred to local control by 1958.

Louisiana Highway 1232

Louisiana Highway 1232 (LA 1232) runs  in a southeast to northwest direction from LA 501 north of Calvin to LA 156 north of Winnfield.  The route is bannered east–west, and its mileposts increase from the eastern end contrary to common practice.  LA 1232 is currently proposed for deletion as part of La DOTD's Road Transfer Program.

Louisiana Highway 1233

Louisiana Highway 1233 (LA 1233) runs  in a north–south direction from LA 156 east of Goldonna to LA 126 at Pine Ridge.

Louisiana Highway 1234

Louisiana Highway 1234 (LA 1234) runs  in a southeast to northwest direction from LA 505 in Gansville to LA 126 west of Dodson.  The route is bannered east–west, and its mileposts increase from the eastern end contrary to common practice.  LA 1234 is currently proposed for deletion as part of La DOTD's Road Transfer Program.

Louisiana Highway 1235

Louisiana Highway 1235 (LA 1235) runs  in a north–south direction from LA 126 in Dodson to the intersection of two local roads northeast of Dodson.  It is currently proposed for deletion as part of La DOTD's Road Transfer Program.

Louisiana Highway 1236

Louisiana Highway 1236 (LA 1236) runs  in an east–west direction from US 167 south of Dodson to LA 34 southeast of Dodson.  It is currently proposed for deletion as part of La DOTD's Road Transfer Program.

Louisiana Highway 1237

Louisiana Highway 1237 (LA 1237) runs  in a northeast to southwest direction from a point on Jake Creel Road southwest of Sikes to the junction of LA 126 and LA 499 in Sikes.  The route is bannered north–south, and its mileposts increase from the northern end contrary to common practice.  LA 1237 is currently proposed for deletion as part of La DOTD's Road Transfer Program.

Louisiana Highway 1238

Louisiana Highway 1238 (LA 1238) runs  in a north–south direction from the intersection of two local roads at Flat Creek to LA 127 southeast of Hickory Valley.  The route's mileposts increase from the northern end contrary to common practice.  LA 1238 is currently proposed for deletion as part of La DOTD's Road Transfer Program.

Louisiana Highway 1239

Louisiana Highway 1239 (LA 1239) consists of two road segments with a total length of  that are located in the Grant Parish town of Montgomery.  Both segments are proposed for deletion as part of La DOTD's Road Transfer Program.

LA 1239-1 runs  along Old Jefferson Highway from Creola Street to the junction of US 71 (Euclid Street) and LA 122.  The western portion of the route formerly connected the town of Montgomery with a ferry across the Red River and was designated as State Route 1105 prior to the 1955 Louisiana Highway renumbering.  The portion east of Woodland Street was once part of the Jefferson Highway auto trail and the original State Route 1, the predecessor of US 71 through the area.  After the highway was re-routed through town in the 1930s to eliminate two railroad crossings, the original alignment became State Route 1-D for a time prior to the 1955 renumbering.
LA 1239-2 runs  along Caddo Street from LA 1239-1 (Old Jefferson Highway) to the junction of US 71 (Euclid Street) and LA 34 (Mulberry Street).  It served as the eastern portion of State Route 1105 prior to the 1955 renumbering.

Louisiana Highway 1240

Louisiana Highway 1240 (LA 1240) runs  in a north–south direction from US 71 northwest of Aloha to LA 122 in Verda.  It is an undivided two-lane highway for its entire length.

The route heads north from a point on US 71 between Colfax and Montgomery and passes alongside Nantachie Lake.  It proceeds through a heavily wooded area until reaching its terminus at LA 122 in Verda.

Prior to the 1955 Louisiana Highway renumbering, LA 1240 was designated as State Route C-1432.  It is currently proposed for deletion as part of La DOTD's Road Transfer Program.

Louisiana Highway 1241

Louisiana Highway 1241 (LA 1241) runs  in an east–west direction from US 71 southeast of Rock Hill to US 167 in Prospect.  It is currently proposed for deletion as part of La DOTD's Road Transfer Program.

Louisiana Highway 1242

Louisiana Highway 1242 (LA 1242) runs  in an east–west direction off of LA 3210 in Chase.  The route consists of a state-maintained access road to the Louisiana Department of Transportation and Development's District 58 headquarters.  It is an undivided two-lane highway for its entire length.

LA 1242 heads east on Willie Hill Road from a point on LA 3210 immediately east of its junction with the concurrent US 425/LA 15.  After passing the La DOTD facility, the LA 1242 designation ends as the road transitions from state to parish maintenance.

Louisiana Highway 1243

Louisiana Highway 1243 (LA 1243) runs  in a north–south direction along McKeithen Drive from LA 488 southwest of Alexandria to LA 28 in Alexandria.  It is currently proposed for deletion as part of La DOTD's Road Transfer Program.

Louisiana Highway 1244

Louisiana Highway 1244 (LA 1244) ran  in a southeast to northwest direction from LA 31 to the I-49 frontage road in Opelousas.  The route was part of LA 31 prior to 1998 and was transferred to local control in 2003.

Louisiana Highway 1245

Louisiana Highway 1245 (LA 1245) runs  in a north–south direction along Access Road from LA 300 to LA 46 east of Poydras.  The route's mileposts increase from its northern end contrary to common practice.

LA 1245 is a short connector located in an unincorporated area of St. Bernard Parish east of Poydras and Sebastopol.  The route heads north along Leon Road from LA 300 (Bayou Road) and proceeds to a junction with the parallel LA 46.  It is an undivided two-lane highway for its entire length.

LA 1245 was constructed as a new addition to the state highway system in 2002.  It was designed to provide truck traffic from the area's industrial plants with a safer connection to LA 46 than the narrow and winding LA 300.

Louisiana Highway 1246

Louisiana Highway 1246 (LA 1246) runs  in an east–west direction along Lulu Road from Woodlawn Road to LA 82 north of Abbeville.  The route consists of the state-maintained Woodlawn Bridge, a swing bridge spanning the Vermilion River, and its approaches.  It is an undivided two-lane highway for its entire length, and its mileposts increase from the eastern end contrary to common practice.  LA 1246 is currently proposed for deletion as part of La DOTD's Road Transfer Program.

Louisiana Highway 1247

Louisiana Highway 1247 (LA 1247) runs  in a northeast to southwest direction from LA 1010 at Brule to LA 308 in Labadieville.  The route's mileposts increase from the northern or eastern end contrary to common practice.  LA 1247 was formerly part of LA 398, and it is currently proposed for deletion as part of La DOTD's Road Transfer Program. As of 2019, it is under agreement to be removed from the state highway system and transferred to local control.

Louisiana Highway 1248

Louisiana Highway 1248 (LA 1248) runs  in a general north–south direction along Bluebonnet Boulevard from LA 30 to I-10 in Baton Rouge.  As of 2017, it is under agreement to be removed from the state highway system and transferred to local control.

Louisiana Highway 1249

Louisiana Highway 1249 (LA 1249) runs  in a north–south direction from LA 22 east of Springfield to LA 1040 west of Hammond.  It is currently proposed for deletion as part of La DOTD's Road Transfer Program.

The route begins at a point on LA 22 in Tangipahoa Parish just across the Livingston Parish line from Springfield.  It proceeds north along Pumpkin Center Road through the community of Pumpkin Center and passes through an interchange with I-12 at Exit 35.  The route continues north a short distance further to a junction with LA 1040 (Old Baton Rouge Highway).  LA 1249 is an undivided two-lane highway for its entire length.

Louisiana Highway 1250

Louisiana Highway 1250 (LA 1250) runs  in a general east–west direction from US 165 Bus. to the US 167 frontage road in Pineville.  It has a spur that travels  along East Shamrock Street from Melrose Street to Expressway Drive, the frontage road.

The route was formerly part of LA 107.  Both LA 1250 and its spur are currently proposed for deletion as part of La DOTD's Road Transfer Program.

Louisiana Highway 1251

Louisiana Highway 1251 (LA 1251) runs  in a southwest to northeast direction from LA 1 to LA 75 in Plaquemine.  The route serves as an access road to the Plaquemine Ferry across the Mississippi River and is open to authorized vehicles only.  It is currently proposed for deletion as part of La DOTD's Road Transfer Program.

Louisiana Highway 1252

Louisiana Highway 1252 (LA 1252) runs  in a general east–west direction from the I-49 frontage road north of Carencro to the Lafayette–St. Martin parish line northeast of Carencro.  The route was formerly part of LA 726, and it is currently proposed for deletion as part of La DOTD's Road Transfer Program.

Louisiana Highway 1253

Louisiana Highway 1253 (LA 1253) runs  in an east–west direction from the intersection of two local roads to a junction with I-10 in New Orleans.

The route begins at Downman Road between US 90 (Chef Menteur Highway) and LA 47 (Hayne Boulevard) and proceeds eastward along Morrison Road to an interchange with I-10 at exit 241.  It is a divided four-lane highway for its entire length.

LA 1253 is a vestige of the original plans for the Eastern Expressway, incorporated into the route for I-10 by the time of its construction in the 1960s, which would have connected Morrison Road with North Claiborne Avenue via an expressway in the median of Elysian Fields Avenue.  In the pre-1955 state highway system, the proposed route was given the temporary designation of State Route 2200, changed to LA 3021 in the 1955 Louisiana Highway renumbering.  The disconnected Elysian Fields Avenue and Morrison Road segments were ultimately left out of the expressway plans and, though never connected, both retained the LA 3021 designation until the latter segment was given its own number in 2002.

Louisiana Highway 1254

Louisiana Highway 1254 (LA 1254) runs  in an east–west direction along Mary Hill Road from a dead end on the east side of US 167 to the junction of US 165 and US 165 Bus. in Pineville.  The route's mileposts increase from the eastern end contrary to common practice.  LA 1254 was formerly part of LA 1203, and it is currently proposed for deletion as part of La DOTD's Road Transfer Program.

Louisiana Highway 1255

Louisiana Highway 1255 (LA 1255) runs  in a southeast to northwest direction along South Hudson Avenue from US 167 to the western side of the Kansas City Southern Railway overpass in Jonesboro.  The route is bannered north–south.  It was formerly part of US 167, and it is currently proposed for deletion as part of La DOTD's Road Transfer Program.

Louisiana Highway 1256

Louisiana Highway 1256 (LA 1256) runs  in a north–south direction from the concurrent LA 27 and LA 108 in Carlyss to I-10 in Sulphur.

The route once extended north to US 90 and served as the original alignment of LA 27 through the area.  The current alignment to the east was constructed in 1962 and designated as LA 3077 until 1999 when it became part of LA 27.  The original route became LA 27 Bus. briefly until it assumed its current designation as LA 1256 in 2003.  In 2012, the route was truncated on its north end to the I-10 interchange.  The remainder is currently proposed for deletion as part of La DOTD's Road Transfer Program.

Louisiana Highway 1257

Louisiana Highway 1257 (LA 1257) runs  in an east–west direction along Loop Park Road from US 425 to the entrance of Chemin-A-Haut State Park northeast of Bastrop.

Louisiana Highway 1258

Louisiana Highway 1258 (LA 1258) runs  in an east–west direction along Old Boyce Road from LA 498 in Alexandria to a point at the city limits.  It is currently proposed for deletion as part of La DOTD's Road Transfer Program.

Louisiana Highway 1259

Louisiana Highway 1259 (LA 1259) runs  in an east–west direction from a local road to a junction with LA 3002 in Denham Springs.  It is currently proposed for deletion as part of La DOTD's Road Transfer Program.

Louisiana Highway 1260

Louisiana Highway 1260 (LA 1260) ran  in an east–west direction from a dead end at the Vermilion River at Bancker to a junction with LA 330.  The route was part of LA 690 prior to 2008 and was transferred to local control in 2015.

Louisiana Highway 1261

Louisiana Highway 1261 (LA 1261) runs  in a southeast to northwest direction along Peters Road from LA 23 to a local road south of Belle Chasse.  The route is bannered north–south.

LA 1261 represents the completed portion of the Peters Road Extension project which will ultimately extend northwest approximately  further on a new alignment to connect with LA 3017 at the Plaquemines–Jefferson parish line.  It will require a bridge across the Gulf Intracoastal Waterway near its northwestern end.

Louisiana Highway 1262

Louisiana Highway 1262 (LA 1262) runs  in a north–south direction along North Lakeshore Drive from Broad Street to the concurrent I-10/US 90 in Lake Charles.

Louisiana Highway 1263

Louisiana Highway 1263 (LA 1263) ran  in a general north–south direction from the intersection of two local roads at the St. Francisville town limits to the junction of US 61 and LA 10 in St. Francisville.

The route began at the intersection of Ferdinand Street and Old Ferry Road at the St. Francisville corporate limits in West Feliciana Parish.  It traveled northeast into town on Ferdinand Street to a T-intersection with LA 3057 at Commerce Street.  LA 1263 turned northwest onto Commerce Street, running concurrent with LA 3057 until reaching a second T-intersection at Jackson Road.  The route then turned northeast onto Jackson Road and proceeded to a four-way intersection with US 61 and LA 10.  LA 1263 was an undivided two-lane highway for its entire length.

Prior to 2011, LA 1263 was part of LA 10, which crossed the Mississippi River by ferry until the completion of the John James Audubon Bridge downstream.  The first signs erected labeled the route as LA 1258 apparently in error, as the official La DOTD highway maps and GIS showed the route as LA 1263.  The portion of the route between the old ferry landing and the St. Francisville town limit was returned to local control in 2016 as part of the La DOTD's Road Transfer Program.  The remainder of the route was deleted in 2018.

Louisiana Highway 1264

Louisiana Highway 1264 (LA 1264) runs  in an east–west direction along Leon C. Simon Drive in New Orleans.  It consists of the Senator Ted Hickey Bridge over the Inner Harbor Navigation Canal and its approaches.  The bridge and waterway are commonly referred to as the Seabrook Bridge and Industrial Canal, respectively.  The route's mileposts increase from the eastern end contrary to common practice.

Louisiana Highway 1265

Louisiana Highway 1265 (LA 1265) runs  in a northeast to southwest direction along Five Forks Road from Thomas Sanders Road to a junction with LA 153 south of Ashland.

Louisiana Highway 1266

Louisiana Highway 1266 (LA 1266) runs  in a north–south direction along Pleasant Drive from the entrance of Palmetto Island State Park to LA 690 south of Abbeville.

See also

References

Footnotes

Works cited

External links
Maps / GIS Data Homepage, Louisiana Department of Transportation and Development